Westerholm is a Swedish-language surname, more common in Finland than in Sweden.

Geographical distribution
As of 2014, 53.5% of all known bearers of the surname Westerholm were residents of Finland (frequency 1:4,284), 25.0% of Sweden (1:16,439), 15.6% of the United States (1:963,337) and 1.0% of Estonia (1:57,464).

In Finland, the frequency of the surname was higher than national average (1:4,284) in the following regions:
 1. Ostrobothnia (1:1,413)
 2. Åland (1:1,794)
 3. Uusimaa (1:1,928)
 4. Southwest Finland (1:3,368)

In Sweden, the frequency of the surname was higher than national average (1:16,439) in the following counties:
 1. Södermanland County (1:7,159)
 2. Blekinge County (1:7,330)
 3. Uppsala County (1:9,204)
 4. Kalmar County (1:9,455)
 5. Stockholm County (1:10,061)
 6. Östergötland County (1:10,673)
 7. Jönköping County (1:12,739)

People
Barbro Westerholm (born 1933), Swedish politician
Charles Westerholm (1897–1977), American cyclist
George Westerholm, Canadian musician, singer, comedian and writer
Raino Westerholm (1919–2017), Finnish politician
Victor Westerholm (1860–1919), Finnish landscape painter

References

Swedish-language surnames